Leila Ghandi (born July 26, 1980), nicknamed "The Moroccan Titouan Lamazou" or "Bent Battouta" (The daughter of Ibn Battuta), is a Moroccan photographer and journalist.

Early life 
Leila was born in Casablanca in 1980. She is the daughter of Amal Alami and Ali Ghandi, former Director General of the Moroccan Association of the pharmaceutical industry died March 13, 2010.
At age of 5, she entered the Théophile Gautier-school located in the district of Maârif until 1991, the date when she joined the Lycée Lyautey. After obtaining her baccalauréat in the Lycée Lyautey of Casablanca in 1998, Leila Ghandi joined between 1998 and 2002 BEM Management School in Bordeaux and studied international business. Later, in 2004, she obtained her Master at Sciences Po in Strategic Marketing in Politics. During her studies in Sciences Po, between 2002 and 2004, she did an exchange at the University of Portsmouth and obtain a degree in European Business and Management.

Career

Chroniques de Chine 
Leila Ghandi trip to China in 2003.

During her travel, she regularly sent emails to her family to tell them about her new life. Back in Morocco, the idea came to her to bring all her notes into a book. Thus it published in December 2006 Chronicles from China published by Le Fennec Editions. The preface of the book was done by Dominique Reynié, who was her professor at the Sciences Po in Paris.

In 2008, she was a member of the jury at the 12th International Film Festival Adventure and Discovery in Val-d'Isère. The same year, she won the "Trophy of Success in the Feminine" at the Luxembourg Palace, delivered by Secretary of State for Urban Policy Fadela Amara.

In 2009, she receives for her book the Literary prize from the United States Agency for International Development (USAID).

Voyages avec Leila Ghandi 
Since 2012, she animated a program with her name on 2M TV Voyages avec Leila Ghandi (Travels with Leila Ghandi) which are broadcast monthly in prime time for the documentary program Des Histoires et des Hommes (Histories and Humans).

It is a series of travel documentaries which highlight the culture and lifestyle of each country, through human stories, where she tries to dine and stay with the locals.

During her trip to Palestine in 2013, she met several personalities including Michel Warschawski, President Mahmoud Abbas she interviews for nearly an hour in his office of Mukataa in Ramallah.

With this episode, she won in the same year the prize Anna Lindh Mediterranean Journalist Award TV category, organized by the Anna Lindh Euro-Mediterranean Foundation for the Dialogue Between Cultures, advancing journalists of France 2 and Arte.

In 2013, Leila Ghandi participates in the documentary of Serge Moati "Méditerranéennes – mille et un combats" [Mediterranean – thousand and one battles], broadcast on France 2 in the program .

Her episode "Leila Ghandi in Tunisia" was in competition at the Monte-Carlo Television Festival in June 2013.

In January 2014, she was elected among the 50 personalities that make Morocco by the magazine Jeune Afrique.

The program Voyages avec Leila Ghandi have been shown in three seasons, and as of June 2016 18 episodes have been broadcast:

Personal life 
According to TelQuel, Leila Ghandi earn a salary around 20 000 dirhams per month ($2000  USD).

During the French tour of jazz singer Dee Dee Bridgewater in 2000, Leila Ghandi accompanied him as a dancer. Percussionist, she is also a member of the Brazilian group "Batala" that occurs in many festivals and carnivals.

Between 3 and 8 May 2015, with twenty women, she participates in the "Women and Power: Leadership in a New World" program organized by the John F. Kennedy School of Government at Harvard University

Exhibitions 
In December 2005, she exhibited some specimens around the Abbey of Saint-Germain-des-Prés in Paris.

She exhibits the same series at the Art Lounge Gallery of Beirut in April 2006, under the name of "Timeless China & spiritual, portraits of Tibet".

In January 2007, she participated with four other photographers to exposition "Regards (de) marocains sur le monde" held at the Church of the Sacred Heart of Casablanca.

In March/April 2012, she exhibited her collection "Vies à vies" in the Art Gallery CDG of Rabat.

Awards 
 Trophée EuroMed de la Réussite au Féminin delivered in Luxembourg Palace by Fadela Amara (2008)
 Literary prize of United States Agency for International Development (2009)
 Opinion Leader by Search for Common Ground (2010)
 Femme d'excellence by Marseille-Provence 2013 (2012)
 Mediterranean Journalist Award by Anna Lindh Euro-Mediterranean Foundation for the Dialogue Between Cultures (2013)
 Chevalier of the Order of Arts and Letters (2014)

Bibliography

References

External links 
 
 
  
Leila Alaoui
Antoine de Maximy

1980 births
People from Casablanca
Alumni of Lycée Lyautey (Casablanca)
Sciences Po alumni
Alumni of the University of Portsmouth
Chevaliers of the Ordre des Arts et des Lettres
Moroccan photographers
Moroccan women photographers
Moroccan women journalists
Moroccan television presenters
Living people
21st-century photographers
21st-century Moroccan artists
Moroccan women artists
Moroccan women television presenters